Ülenurme is a small borough in Tartu County, in Kambja Parish, in Estonia. It was the administrative centre of Ülenurme Parish. Ülenurme has a population of 1,574 (as of 1 September 2010).

Tartu Airport, which is sometimes called Ülenurme Airport, is located near Ülenurme in Reola village.

Ülenurme has a station on Tartu–Koidula railway.

Gallery

References

External links
Ülenurme Parish 

Boroughs and small boroughs in Estonia